"Thank You" is the first single from rapper Lil' Bow Wow off his second album Doggy Bag (2001). The song features R&B group Jagged Edge, producer Jermaine Dupri and singer Fundisha. The beat production samples "I'm Not the One" by The Cars.

A music video was shot in Chicago, where some of his fans appeared as extras.ss

Charts

References

2001 singles
2001 songs
Bow Wow (rapper) songs
Jagged Edge (American group) songs
Jermaine Dupri songs
Song recordings produced by Jermaine Dupri
Songs written by Bryan-Michael Cox
Songs written by Jermaine Dupri
Songs written by Ric Ocasek
So So Def Recordings singles